Richard Blanco (born February 15, 1968) is an American poet, public speaker, author, playwright, and civil engineer. He is the fifth poet to read at a United States presidential inauguration, having read the poem "One Today" for Barack Obama's second inauguration. He is the first immigrant, the first Latino, the first openly gay person and at the time the youngest person to be the U.S. inaugural poet.

Since the inauguration, Blanco has been named a Woodrow Wilson Visiting Fellow and has received honorary doctorates from Macalester College, Colby College. Lesley University, and the University of Rhode Island. He has been a professor, having taught at Georgetown University, American University, Central Connecticut State University, Wesleyan University, Wentworth Institute of Technology, Colby College, Carlow University, and currently at Florida International University.  His passion is to demystify poetry teaching to all ages including grade school to nursing homes, at diverse writers workshops (e.g. Omega Institute, Maine Media Workshops), correctional institutions, and several non-profit organizations including the Writer's Center.  He serves as the first Education Ambassador for the Academy of American Poets.

Blanco is currently on the faculty of Florida International University, his alma mater for both Bachelor of Science in Civil Engineering (1991) and Masters of Fine Arts in Creative Writing (1997).  He was appointed as a founding member of President Obama Foundation Advisory Council and has lectured at the US National Archives Poetry of LGBTQ history for Human and Civil Rights.  Since 2014 he has hosted visiting writers program and retreat at Gould Academy. Blanco is a member of the prestigious Macondo Writers Workshop, the workshop founded by Sandra Cisneros.  Recently Blanco was elected as Vice Chair of Board of Trustees at Colby College.  d

In 2015, the Academy of American Poets chose Blanco to serve as its first Education Ambassador. He has been named a Woodrow Wilson Visiting Fellow and has received honorary doctorates from Macalester College, Colby College and the University of Rhode Island. He has been featured on CBS Sunday Morning, NPR’s All Things Considered and Fresh Air with Terry Gross, as well as major media from around the world, including CNN, Telemundo, AC360, BBC, Univision, and PBS. Blanco’s poems and essays have appeared in numerous publications and anthologies, including the Best American Poetry series, The Nation, The New Republic, the Huffington Post, and Condé Nast Traveler. With Ruth Behar, he is co-creator of the blog Bridges to/from Cuba: Lifting the Emotional Embargo, which shares the histories of Cubans around the world.

Early life and education

Richard Blanco's mother, seven months pregnant, and the rest of the family arrived as exiles from Cuba to Madrid where he was born on February 15, 1968. Forty-five days later, the family immigrated once more to New York City. Eventually, the family settled in Miami, where he was raised and educated. After a successful career as a civil engineer, he pursued poetry and obtained a master’s degree in creative writing. Growing up among close-knit Cuban exiles instilled in him a strong sense of community, dignity, and identity that he’d carry into his adult life as a writer.  

Blanco also excelled in math and the sciences. As such, his parents encouraged him to study engineering, believing that it could provide him a more stable career. He earned a degree from Florida International University in 1991, and began working as a consulting civil engineer in Miami.  In 1997, he returned to Florida International University, where he was mentored by the poet Campbell McGrath, and earned a Master of Fine Arts in creative writing. Blanco's father passed away before Richard wrote his first poem.

Literary career

Adulthood and early career (1997-2012) 
Blanco's first book of poetry, City of a Hundred Fires, was published in 1998 to critical acclaim, winning the Agnes Lynch Starrett Poetry Prize from the University of Pittsburgh Press. The collection explored his cultural yearnings and contradictions as a Cuban-American coming of age in Miami and captured the details of his transformational first trip to Cuba, his figurative homeland.  The poems explored his cultural yearnings and contradictions as a Cuban-American and captured the details of his transformational first trip to Cuba, his figurative homeland. After the success of his first book, Blanco took a hiatus from his engineering career and accepted a position at Central Connecticut State University as a professor of creative writing. While living in Connecticut, he met his current life-partner, Dr. Mark Neveu, a renowned research scientist.

Between 1999 and 2001, Blanco traveled extensively through Spain, Italy, France, Guatemala, Brazil, Cuba, and New England. Eventually, in 2002, he and Mark moved to Washington, DC, where he taught at Georgetown and American universities, The Writers Center, and the Arlington County Detention Facility. His travel experiences resulted in his second book of poems, Directions to The Beach of the Dead (2005), which received the Beyond Margins Award from the PEN American Center for his explorations of the ideal of home and the connections sought through place, culture, family, and love. 

In 2004, Blanco returned to Miami and resumed his engineering career. He designed several town revitalization projects, while continuing to write poetry. He began working on another collection before moving once again, this time to Bethel, Maine. While in Maine, he completed his third book of poetry, Looking for The Gulf Motel (2012), which related Blanco’s complex navigation through his cultural, sexual, and artistic identities, and received the Paterson Poetry Prize, the 2012 Maine Literary Award for Poetry, and the Thom Gunn Award.  This collection was recipient of the Paterson Poetry Prize and the Thom Gunn Award.  In this collection, he explored his Cuban heritage in his early works and his role as a gay man in Cuban-American culture in Looking for the Gulf Motel (2012). He explained: "It's trying to understand how I fit between negotiating the world, between being mainstream gay and being Cuban gay." In the poem "Queer Theory, According to My Grandmother," he described how his grandmother warned him as a young boy: "For God's sake, never pee sitting down ... /I've seen you" and "Don't stare at The Six-Million-Dollar Man./I've seen you." and "Never dance alone in your room." According to Time magazine, he "views the more conservative, hard-line exile cohort of his parents' generation ... with a skeptical eye." John Dolan was critical of his style, calling his work "pure identity poetics, unsullied by one single stray thought or original turn of phrase."  When asked in a May 7, 2012 interview with La Bloga whether he considered himself a Cuban writer or simply a writer, Blanco responded: "I am a writer who happens to be Cuban, but I reserve the right to write about anything I want, not just my cultural identity. Aesthetically and politically, I don't exclusively align myself with any one particular group—Latino, Cuban, gay, or 'white'—but I embrace them all. Good writing is good writing. I like what I like."

Childhood memoir (2015) 
He has authored the memoir The Prince of Los Cocuyos: A Miami Childhood, winner of the 2015 Maine Literary Award for Memoirand  Lambda Literary Prize. Currently, he is working with Michael Eisner at the Tornante Company as a co-executive producer and co-writer for a sitcom based on his childhood memoir.

Inaguration poem and acclaim (2013-present) 
President Barack Obama selected Blanco in 2012 to serve as the fifth presidential inaugural poet in U.S. history. On January 8, 2013, he was named the inaugural poet for Barack Obama's second inauguration, the fifth person to play that role. He was the first immigrant, first Latino, and first gay person to be the inaugural poet. He was also the youngest. 
Maya Angelou said of Blanco: “He showed great courage, and it’s courage (that) is the most important of all the virtues because without courage, you can’t practice any other virtue consistently. So I was very pleased with that".
He was asked to compose three poems from which inauguration officials selected the one he would read. After reading "One Today," he said to his mother: "Well, Mom, I think we're finally American." The poem he presented, "One Today", was called "a humble, modest poem, one presented to a national audience as a gift of comradeship, and in the context of political, pop, and media culture, a quiet assertion that poetry deserves its place in our thoughts on this one day, and every day." Others called it "a rare break from the staid custom of ceremony that the rest of the afternoon brought" and assessed it as "Overall, the poem is successful, art meant to orient, to reconfirm collective identity in a time of recent tragedy. It's an optimistic, careful piece meant to encourage, a balm." 

Blanco planned to publish all three poems he composed for the event. He did so with the publication of For All of Us, One Today on November 19, 2013. The memoir chronicles his American Dream experiences creating the poems commissioned for the inaugural. Blanco shared the emotional details of his experiences as presidential inaugural poet and reflected on his understanding of what it means to be an American.  It includes "One Today" along with the two other poems, "Mother Country" and "What We Know of Country," in English and Spanish.   A children’s book of his presidential inaugural poem, One Today, in collaboration with renowned illustrator Dav Pilkey, was released in 2015. In his first prose publication, For All of Us, One Today: An Inaugural Poet’s Journey (2013),

Poetry books (2017-present) 
The fine-press book Boundaries (2017), a collaboration with photographer Jacob Hessler, featured Blanco’s poems paired with Hessler’s photographs. Together, their work investigated the boundaries of race, gender, class, and ethnicity, among many others; and challenged the physical, imagined, and psychological dividing lines—both historic and current—that shadow the United States. In his latest collection of poems, How to Love a Country (Beacon Press, 2019), Blanco invites a conversation with all Americans.

In 2019, Blanco published poetry collection How to Love a Country that explores gun violence, racism, LGBTQ issues, and more, in accessible and emotive verses. The poems address varied topics: the Pulse nightclub massacre; an unexpected encounter on a visit to Cuba; the forced exile of 8,500 Navajos in 1868; a lynching in Alabama; the arrival of a young Chinese woman at Angel Island in 1938; the incarceration of a gifted writer; and the poet’s abiding love for his partner, who he is finally allowed to wed as a gay man.

As he explained to NPR, “America is a work-in-progress — ever changing and fluid — and we need to rework the rhetoric, the conversation, because from its very inception our nation has been about immigration and immigrants, who are not a drain on us, but the essence of who we are and our very survival economically, politically, culturally and — most importantly — spiritually.”  On Being with Krista Tippet featured an interview related to the poem "Declaration of Interdepence" and How To Love a Country in a recent interview with Blanco.

Community support for arts and humanites (2013-present) 
In May 2013, for victims and survivors of the Boston Marathon bombing Blanco wrote and performed a poem for the Boston Strong Benefit Concert at TD Garden and Fenway Park ("Boston Strong"). A chapbook of the poem was also published and net proceeds of all sales benefiting the One Fund, which helps victims of the Boston Marathon bombing. On November 22, 2013, Blanco participated in the official Tribute 50th ceremony for President John F. Kennedy.  In 2016 Blanco gave National Archives Keynote lecture on the National Coversation on LGBTQ Human and Civil Rights.Blanco was commissioned to write and perform a poem commemorating a New Era in US-Cuba Relationsnumerous occasional poems for organizations and events such as the re-opening ceremony of the U.S. Embassy in Cuba ("Matters of the Sea / Cosas del mar"),   The poem title refers to the 90 miles of water between Cuba and the U.S. that serves both to separate and unite people.  The purpose was to spur Cubans to reunite emotionally after years of separation due to politics, travel restrictions and an economic embargo. and to serve as a catalyst for emotional reconciliation.

Blanco has been commissioned to write and perform numerous occasional poems for organizations and eventsFreedom to Marry ("Until We Could"), the Tech Awards of Silicon Valley ("Genius of Stars and Love"), the opening of Aspen Ideas Festival ("Cloud Anthem"), Orlando Pulse Nightclub Tragedy ("One Pulse - One Poem"), International Spa Association ISPA Conference and Expo ("Ignite the Self Who Loves You Most"), University of Miami commencement ("Teach Us, Then"), the Fragrance Foundation Awards at the Lincoln Center for Performing Arts ("To the Artists Invisible"), and commissioned by USA Today for National Hispanic Heritage Month ("the U.S. of us").  He collaborated with author and artist Nikki Moustaki to create a video for his poem "Election Year" that was also published in the Boston Globe two days before the 2016 election of President Donald Trump.
Since 2017, Blanco has been contributor and host of the "Village Voice" radio program on WGBH (Boston).

Blanco has collaborated with Bacardi Havana Club on the launch of their heritage campaign "Don't Tell Us We're Not Cuban", Samuel Adams Brewery on "Love Conquers All, Pride" and Philadelphia Boys Choir on lyrics for Gershwin's re-imagined Cuban Overture.  Other collaborations include musical compositions with jazz/classical pianist and composer Paul Sullivan, prized composer Pablo Ortiz choral setting of "Leaving Limerick in the Rain" at Boston Symphony Hall for Terezin Music Foundation to honor the 70th Anniversary Liberation of Nazi concentration camps, and several poems from his recent book How to Love a Country by minister of music and composer Tom Davis.  He was honored that his poem "One Today" was projected on the big screen at the U2 Joshua Tree tour.  In 2020, The Atlantic commissioned a poem for the coronavirus pandemic called "Say This Isn't the End."  Inspired by an exhibition at the Dallas Museum of Art, Richard explores the meaning of home in his poem Imaginary My/gration  

Following the 2021 capital insurrection, he published in New York Times Magazine the poem "And So We All Fall Down During a reprieve from the pandemic, Blanco was commencement speaker for Colby College on May 23, 2021 and performed his original poem "Your Self in You, Again" (video link).  In 2022, Blanco's poem "Looking for the Gulf Motel" was featured in PBS Poetry in America with commentary by Gloria Estefan, Jorge Moreno, America Fuentes with executive producer Lisa New (video link).  In 2022, Blanco published his poem Uncertain-Sea Principle modeled after the Heisenburg Uncertaincy Principle in Scientifc American.  This stereoscope or contrapuntal poem can be read in more than one way, such as left to right across the two columns or down first one column and then the other.  

In 2022, Blanco was named first poet laureate of Miami-Dade county in southern Florida.  In his role as Poet Laureate Blanco created Miami's Favorite Poems Project. This project invites people from all walks of life to share a favorite poem that has had some meaningful impact on their life and thinking.  The project was launched at the Miami Book Fair on Nov. 19, 2022. Featured special guest readers included Mayor Daniella Levine Cava, Miami Dade College President Madeline Pumariega, former U.S. Poet Laureate Robert Pinsky, poet and novelist Sandra Cisneros, and poet Marci Calabretta Cancio-Bello, among others in our community.In 2023, for Mayor Daniella Levine Cava of Miami Dade, Blanco performed at her State of the County Address an occassional poem Light of our Light.

In 2023, he wrote and performed a poem What Governs Us at the second Inaguration of Maine Governor Janet Mills.

New works 
Richard Blanco and Vanessa Garcia collaborated as co-writers for the play SWEET GOATS and BLUBERRY SEÑORITAS at Portland Stage.  A review in Broadway World "heralds the magical debut of a haunting new dramatic voice. Poet Blanco and his collaborator Garcia have created a delicate, sad-sweet memory play, inhabited by six memorable and widely disparate characters, whose shards of reminiscence come together in the cold winter landscape of a small Maine town."  "shepherding one of contemporary literature's loveliest poetic voices to the stage ... is a memorable one and - one can hope - the beginning of something wonderful."  Beatriz, a Cuban American baker in Maine, tries to figure out whether she should stay with the community she’s developed, or reunite with her estranged mother in Miami. Along the way Beatriz explores what it means to belong as she cooks up the recipes of her childhood with the raw ingredients of Maine. This is a Maine Made Play commissioned by Portland Stage.

Blanco currently serves as on the advisory board for the Obama Foundation.

With former Disney CEO, Michael Eisner, Blanco is co-executive producer and co-writer of a TV sitcom currently under development and based on his memoir about growing up in Miami. He is a co-lyricist for a musical based on the National Book Award winning memoir “Waiting for Snow in Havana,” about Operation Peter Pan.

Blanco and his husband share their time between Surfside, Florida, and Bethel, Maine.

Other publications 
Blanco's poetry has appeared in The Nation, The New Yorker, The Atlantic, USA Today, Scientific America, Ploughshares, The New Republic, Indiana Review, New York Times Magazine, Michigan Quarterly Review, New England Review, VOX, Americas Review and numerous other publications.  He has published articles and essays in The New York Times, Conde Nast Traveler, Huffington Post, Indiana Review and several anthologies, including Norton Anthology of Latino Literature and Great American Prose Poems.  Blanco is part of the online Letras Latinas Oral History Project archives.

Honors and recognition
 1997: Agnes Lynch Starrett Poetry Prize
 2000: John Ciardi Fellowship from the Bread Loaf Writers' Conference
 2003: Residency Fellowship from the Virginia Center for the Creative Arts
 2006: PEN/Beyond Margins Award for Directions to the Beach of the Dead
 2007: Florida Artist Fellowship
 2013: Thom Gunn Award for Gay Poetry, Looking for the Gulf Motel
 2013: Woodrow Wilson Visiting Fellow
 2013: United States Fifth Presidential Inaugural Poet for President Barack Obama ("One Today")
 2013: President John F. Kennedy 50th Tribute - A Nation Remembers
 2013: Honorary Doctor of Letters from Macalester College
 2013: Paterson Poetry Prize
 2014: Honorary Doctor of Letters from Colby College
 2014: Honorary Doctor of Letters from University of Rhode Island
 2014: International Latino Awards Winner: Best Biography – Spanish or Bilingual, For All of Us, One Today: An Inaugural Poet's Journey
 2014: Honorary Degree from Maine College of Art
 2015: Opening Ceremony of US Embassy in Cuba ("Matters of the Sea, Cosas del mar")
 2015: Lambda Literary Award for memoir The Prince of Los Cucuyos: A Miami Childhood. 
 2015: First Education Ambassador Academy of American Poets.
 2015: Maine Literary Award for memoir The Prince of Los Cucuyos: A Miami Childhood.
 2015: Commencement Speaker University of Southern Maine. Never Stop Learning.
 2016: Founding Member of President Obama Legacy Committee
 2016: Honorary Doctorate Degree Lesley University 
 2016: National Archives - National Conversation on LGBTQ Human and Civil Rights
 2018: Inter American Award – Leadership for the Americas  
2019: Advocate Magazine 104 Champions of Pride
2019: Commencement Speaker and Honorary Doctor of Letters from University of Miami ("Teach Us, Then" Poem)
 2019: Carnegie Corporation Great Immigrants Award Honoree
 2019: Gerda Haas Award for Excellence in Human Rights Education and Leadership
 2019: Aspen Institute Ideas Festival Opening ("Cloud Anthem").
 2020: Ernest Hemingway Distinguished Lecture and Visiting Artist (Ketchum, Idaho)
 2021: Colby College Commencement Speaker ("Your Self in You Again")
 2022: PBS Poetry in America Episode ("Looking for the Gulf Motel")
 2022: Elected as Vice Chair Board of Colby College Museum of Art
 2023: Performed occasional poem at the Second Inaguration of Governor Janet Mills of Maine ("What Governs Us").

Bibliography

Books 

 
 
 
 Place of Mind.  Floating Wolf Quarterly Chapbooks.  2011.  ASIN B005JSG3AO
 
 
 
 
 
En Busca Del Gulf Motel (Spanish).  Valparaiso Ediciones. 2014.  
Matters of the Sea / Cosas del mar.  US Embassy in Cuba Opening Ceremony.  University of Pittsburgh Press. 2015. ISBN 978-0822964001  
One Today Children's Book Illustrated by Dav Pilkey, Little Brown Press: 2015  
Counting Time Like People Count Stars: Poems by the Girls of Our Little Roses, San Pedro Sula, Honduras.  Tia Chucha. 2017.  ISBN 9781882688555
Boundaries, Two Ponds Press. 2017.  Limited Edition Fine Press with Photographer Jacob Hessler
Cuba Then, Revised and Expanded, The Monacelli Press; Illustrated edition. 2018  ISBN 978-1580935104
A Study Guide for Richard Blanco's "Translation for Mamá," Cengage Learning Gale. 2018
How to Love a Country. Beacon Press. 2019. , 
Grabbed: Poets & Writers on Sexual Assault, Empowerment & Healing (Afterword by Anita Hill).  Beacon Press. 2020. ISBN 978-0807071847

Selected Anthologies and Essays
  poetry anthology
  poetry anthology
  poetry anthology
  poetry anthology
  poetry anthology  
, essay anthology
Barbara Hamby, David Kirby, eds. (2010).  Seriously Funny: Poems about Love, Death, Religion, Art, Politics, Sex, and Everything Else.  University of Georgia Press.  ISBN 978-0820335698
, poetry anthology
, poetry anthology
, essay anthology
Martín Espada, ed. (2019).  What Saves Us: Poems of Empathy and Outrage in the Age of Trump.  Curbstone Books.  ISBN  978-0810140776
Thelma T. Reyna, ed.  (2020).  When the Virus Came Calling: COVID-19 Strikes America.  Golden Foothills Press.  ISBN 978-0996963275
Anjanette Delgado, ed.  (2021).  Home in Florida: Latinx Writers and the Literature of Uprootedness.  University of Florida Press.  ISBN 978-1683402503
Justin Jannise  (2021).  How to Be Better by Being Worse (New Poets of America Book 45)  BOA Editions Ltd.  ISBN 1950774341

See also

 Cuban American literature
 List of Cuban-American writers

References

External links

Archives 

 Richard Blanco papers at Stuart A. Rose Manuscript, Archives, and Rare Book Library
 Bernard McKenna Richard Blanco papers at Special Collections, University of Delaware Library

Interviews 

 CBS Sunday Morning Interview
 Morning Joe Interview, October 2014
 CNN Interview, August 2015
 "Daniel Olivas interviews Richard Blanco", La Bloga, May 7, 2012
Poetry Society of America: Interview in the series "Red, White, & Blue: Poets on Politics" 
 BBC interview, January 21, 2013

Recorded readings 

 Reading at Claremont McKenna College on September 24, 2018
 Richard Blanco recorded at the Library of Congress for the Hispanic Division's audio literary archive on May 17, 2013
 The Night Heron Barks, fall issue 2020, Richard Blanco, Imaginary Exile from How To Love A Country: Poems by Richard Blanco, Copyright © 2019 by Richard Blanco, with permission from Beacon Press, Boston Massachusetts, Audio recording used with special permission from the Author

Other external links 
 Official Website
 "Richard Blanco", Poets.org bio

1968 births
20th-century American poets
21st-century American poets
Agnes Lynch Starrett Poetry Prize winners
American male poets
American memoirists
American University faculty and staff
American writers of Cuban descent
Central Connecticut State University faculty
Florida International University alumni
American gay writers
Georgetown University faculty
Hispanic and Latino American poets
Lambda Literary Award winners
LGBT Hispanic and Latino American people
LGBT people from Florida
LGBT people from Maine
Gay memoirists
Living people
The New Yorker people
People from Bethel, Maine
Poets from Maine
Poets from Florida
Spanish emigrants to the United States
Writers from Miami
20th-century American male writers
21st-century American male writers
20th-century American non-fiction writers
21st-century American non-fiction writers
American male non-fiction writers
Gay academics
American inaugural poets
Christopher Columbus High School (Miami-Dade County, Florida) alumni
Gay poets